Self Defense is a 1932 pre-Code American drama film directed by Phil Rosen and starring Pauline Frederick. It was produced and distributed by Monogram Pictures.

It is preserved in the Library of Congress film collection.

Cast
Pauline Frederick - Katy Devoux
Theodore von Eltz - Tim Reed
Barbara Kent - Nona Devoux
Claire Windsor - Alice
Robert Elliott - Dan Simmons
Henry B. Walthall - Doctor Borden
Jameson Thomas - Jeff Bowman
Willie Fung - Charlie
Lafe McKee - Sandy McKenzie
Si Jenks - Farmer
George "Gabby" Hayes - Jury foreman

References

External links 

 lobby poster

1932 films
Films directed by Phil Rosen
Monogram Pictures films
1932 drama films
American black-and-white films
American drama films
1930s American films
1930s English-language films